Slime and Punishment is the sixth studio album by American crossover thrash band Municipal Waste, released on June 23, 2017. The album title is likely a reference to the Treehouse of Horror short Time and Punishment.

Track listing

Personnel
Municipal Waste
Tony Foresta – lead vocals
Nick Poulos – lead guitar
Ryan Waste – rhythm guitar, backing vocals
Phil Hall – bass, backing vocals
Dave Witte – drums

Guest vocalists
Vinnie Stigma (on "Parole Violators")

Production
Produced by Municipal Waste
Mixed and mastered by Bill Metoyer
Artwork by Andrei Bouzikov

Charts

References

External links
Official website

2017 albums
Municipal Waste (band) albums
Nuclear Blast albums